Saugūniškės is a village in Vilnius district municipality, in Vilnius County, in eastern Lithuania. According to the Lithuanian census of 2011, it has 8 inhabitants.

Surroundings of Saugūniškės are famous for crane roost. Village is known as one of the northernmost known points of Tachytes Panzeri distribution in Europe (Naujos ir retos Lietuvos vabzdžių rūšys. T. 19. P. 64.).

References

Villages in Vilnius County
Vilnius District Municipality